is a railway station on the Keiō Line in Setagaya, Tokyo, operated by the private railway operator Keio Corporation.

Lines

Station layout
This station has two ground-level side platforms.

Platforms

History
Daitabashi Station opened on 15 April 1913.

References

External links

 Daitabashi Station information 

Keio Line
Stations of Keio Corporation
Railway stations in Tokyo
Railway stations in Japan opened in 1913